Maidemau is a village in Lalganj block of Rae Bareli district, Uttar Pradesh, India. It is located 9 km from Lalganj, the block and tehsil headquarters. As of 2011, it has a population of 1,027 people, in 186 households. It has one primary school and no healthcare facilities.

The 1961 census recorded Maidemau as comprising 3 hamlets, with a total population of 562 people (263 male and 299 female), in 93 households and 71 physical houses. The area of the village was given as 360 acres and it had a library at that point.

The 1981 census recorded Maidemau as having a population of 740 people, in 125 households, and having an area of 146.09 hectares. The main staple foods were listed as wheat and rice.

References

Villages in Raebareli district